The Portuguese Outdoor Women's Championship is the top division of women's team's in athletics. It is a competition organised by the Federação Portuguesa de Atletismo. The league consists of 8 teams that are selected after a playoff.

Portuguese Outdoor Women's Champions

1944 : Belenenses
1945 : Sporting
1946 : Sporting
1947 : Sporting
1948 : Belenenses
1949 : Belenenses
1950 : Belenenses
1951 : Belenenses
1952 : Belenenses
1953 : Belenenses
1954 : Belenenses
1955 : Belenenses
1956 : Belenenses
1957 : Belenenses
1958 : Belenenses
1959 : Sporting
1960 : Sporting
1961 : Sporting
1962 : Sporting
1963 : Sporting
1964 : Sporting
1965 : Sporting
1966 : Sporting
1967 : Sporting
1968 : Sporting
1969 : Sporting
1970 : Sporting
1971 : Sporting
1972 : Sporting
1973 : Sporting
1974 : Sporting
1975 : Sporting
1976 : Sporting
1977 : Benfica
1978 : Benfica
1979 : Sporting
1980 : Sporting
1981 : Sporting
1982 : Benfica
1983 : Benfica
1984 : Benfica
1985 : Benfica
1986 : Benfica
1987 : Sporting
1988 : Benfica
1989 : Benfica
1990 : Benfica
1991 : Benfica
1992 : Benfica 
1993 : Benfica
1994 : Benfica
1995 : Sporting
1996 : Sporting
1997 : Sporting
1998 : Sporting
1999 : Sporting
2000 : Sporting
2001 : Sporting
2002 : Sporting
2003 : Sporting
2004 : Sporting
2005 : Sporting
2006 : Sporting
2007 : Sporting
2008 : Sporting
2009 : Sporting
2010 : Porto
2011 : Sporting
2012 : Sporting
2013 : Sporting
2014 : Sporting
2015 : Sporting
2016 : Sporting
2017 : Sporting
2018 : Sporting
2019 : Sporting
2020 : Sporting
2021 : Sporting
2022 : Sporting

Performance by Club

Championships records

Women

See also
Portuguese Outdoor Men's Athletics Championship

References

External links
 Portuguese Athletics Federation Official Website

Athletics in Portugal
Athletics competitions in Portugal
Recurring sporting events established in 1944
Portuguese Athletics Championship
National athletics competitions
1944 establishments in Portugal
Women's athletics competitions